Guinea-Bissau participated at the 2018 Summer Youth Olympics in Buenos Aires, Argentina from 6 to 18 October 2018.

Competitors

Athletics

Judo

Individual

Team

References

Nations at the 2018 Summer Youth Olympics
Guinea-Bissau at the Youth Olympics
You